Suessa may refer to:

Geography
 Sessa Aurunca, town and comune in the province of Caserta, Campania, southern Italy
 Suessa Pometia, ancient city of Latium

People
 Suessa Baldridge Blaine (1860-1932), American writer of temperance pageants
 Taddeo da Suessa (c. 1190/1200 – 1248), Italian jurist